Malaika is a genus of South African araneomorph spiders in the family Phyxelididae, and was first described by Pekka T. Lehtinen in 1967.  it contains only two species, found only in South Africa: M. delicatula and M. longipes.

See also
 List of Phyxelididae species

References

Endemic fauna of South Africa
Araneomorphae genera
Phyxelididae
Taxa named by Pekka T. Lehtinen